Demon Drop is a drop tower amusement ride at Dorney Park & Wildwater Kingdom in Allentown, Pennsylvania. Designed by Intamin, it is a Freefall model that was originally located at Cedar Point when it first opened to the public in 1983. It was relocated to Dorney Park following the 2009 season and reopened in 2010. It is one of the oldest of its kind still in operation.

History

Demon Drop debuted at Cedar Point in 1983. It was very popular as it was located at the very front of the park. In 2005, rumors started of the ride being relocated or dismantled when the ride was put up for sale. On October 21, 2009, Cedar Point officials announced that Demon Drop would be moved to its sister park, Knott's Berry Farm, for the 2010 season. In November, fans of Dorney Park & Wildwater Kingdom spotted pieces similar to Demon Drop at its park in Pennsylvania. On December 2, 2009, it was announced that Demon Drop would not be relocated to Knott's Berry Farm. Instead, it would be relocated to Dorney Park & Wildwater Kingdom. It officially opened at Dorney Park on July 8, 2010.

Ride description

The ride can accommodate up to four riders, and consists of three main sections: the boarding station, the lift tower, and the brake run. Riders are loaded into a gondola near ground level at the station and secured with an over the shoulder harness. The gondola then moves backwards horizontally to the rear base of the lift tower and climbs vertically to the top of the tower. After reaching the top, it slides forward and hangs over the drop track for a few moments until the car is suddenly released, dropping riders . Riders experience g-forces from deceleration as the car enters a pull-out curve which transitions the vertical fall into a horizontal brake run. Riders face upward toward the sky as the gondola rolls through the brake run. After stopping, a mechanism swings the top of the car down, and the gondola moves in reverse at down a 45-degree angle to another track, where it returns to an upright position and returns to the station.

See also
 Power Tower, a S&S Worldwide drop tower ride at Cedar Point
 Dominator, a S&S Worldwide drop ride at Dorney Park & Wildwater Kingdom

References

External links

 Official page
 Demon Drop Photo Gallery

Amusement rides introduced in 1983
Towers completed in 1983
Amusement rides that closed in 2009
Amusement rides introduced in 2010
Amusement rides manufactured by Intamin
Cedar Point
Dorney Park & Wildwater Kingdom
Cedar Fair attractions
Drop tower rides
1983 establishments in Ohio
2009 disestablishments in Ohio
2010 establishments in Pennsylvania